Lipothrix is a genus of springtails belonging to the family Sminthuridae.

The species of this genus are found in Europe.

Species:
 Lipothrix lubbocki (Tullberg, 1872)

References

Collembola